Business machine is a somewhat obsolete term for a machine that assists in the clerical activities common in business companies. Examples include:
 Tabulating machine
 Accounting machine
 Adding machine
 Typewriter
 Computer
 Photocopier

See also 
 International Business Machines, better known as IBM

References 
 John Strider Coleman, The Business Machine: With Mention of William Seward Burroughs, Joseph Boyer, and Others, Since 1880, Literary Licensing, LLC, 2013 .
 James W. Cortada, Before the Computer: IBM, NCR, Burroughs, and Remington Rand and the Industry They Created, 1865-1956, Princeton University Press, 2015 .

Programmable calculators
Early computers
Mechanical calculators